Muggsy was a Saturday morning live action television program that aired on NBC in 1976–1977.

Synopsis
Filmed on location in Bridgeport, Connecticut, the show centered on Margaret “Muggsy” Malloy (Sarah MacDonnell), who lived with her older brother Nick (Ben Masters), a cab driver, in a furnished truck converted into an apartment, behind a gas station. The show followed Muggsy's life in the inner city and the problems she faced growing up, including drugs and gangs. Muggsy was one of few Saturday morning shows that dealt with the contemporary issues of the time.

David Clayton-Thomas of Blood, Sweat & Tears sang the theme song.

Broadcast history
At the start of the 1976-77 television season, Muggsy was part of a three-hour block of six live action shows that aired Saturday mornings on NBC, alongside Land of the Lost, which was entering its third season, and four other new shows: Monster Squad, McDuff, the Talking Dog, Big John, Little John and The Kids from C.A.P.E.R. Muggsy was cancelled in April 1977; The Kids from C.A.P.E.R. replaced it after being put on hiatus during a shakeup of the lineup in November, 1976, in which McDuff, the Talking Dog was cancelled. None of the other shows returned for the start of the 1977-78 television season. Though 13 episodes were made, only 12 of them aired.

Cast
Sarah MacDonnell as Margaret "Muggsy" Malloy
Ben Masters as Nick Malloy
Paul Michael as Gus
Star-Shemah as Clytemnestra
Jimmy McCann as Lil' Man

Episodes

References

External links
 Muggsy page
 Muggsy at the Internet Movie Database
 Sarah MacDonnell at the Internet Movie Database

1976 American television series debuts
1977 American television series endings
1970s American children's television series
NBC original programming
Television shows set in Connecticut